Bonne of Armagnac (19 February 1399 – 1430/35) was the eldest daughter of Bernard VII, Count of Armagnac and Constable of France, and his wife Bonne of Berry.

Marriage 
On 15 April 1410 at the age of 11, she married Charles, Duke of Orléans (left an orphan by his father Louis's assassination in 1407). This marriage made the constable not only Charles's father-in-law but also his natural defender. The Orléans party, left without a leader by Louis's death, thus became the Armagnac party, the name it held up to the treaty of Arras in 1435.

Following the French defeat at the Battle of Agincourt on 25 October 1415, Charles was taken prisoner by the English. Bonne had not borne any children prior to his imprisonment. She died sometime between 1430 and 1435 while her husband was still in captivity.

In literature and art 
Bonne appears in the critically acclaimed historical novel Het woud der verwachting (1949) by Hella Haasse, (translated into English in 1989 under the title "In a Dark Wood Wandering"). The novel portrays the life of Bonne's husband Charles. 

Charles and Bonne's marriage at the Chateau de Dourdan is thought  to be depicted in the elaborate illuminated manuscript entitled Très Riches Heures du duc de Berry (Very Rich Hours of the Duke of Berry) in the illustration for April.

Ancestry

References

Sources

Duchesses of Orléans
1430s deaths
1399 births
15th-century French women
15th-century French people